San Antonio, officially the Municipality of San Antonio,  is a 4th class municipality in the province of Quezon, Philippines. According to the 2020 census, it has a population of 35,891 people.

Located in the westernmost part of the province, it is one of the municipalities that traverses Quezon and Batangas. It has an efficient road system, the National Road linking Tiaong, Quezon and Lipa City through passing Padre Garcia.

San Antonio is then known as Buliran, one of the progressive and component barangay of Tiaong, Quezon covered with thick cogon grasses and Buri trees. It is situated in the western part of Tiaong, its mother municipality, and bounded on the south by the Municipalities of Padre Garcia and Rosario in Batangas. Its history was known through the knowledge of many of its residents. Considering its abundance and economic opportunity, the place was occupied by the Batangueño from the western part of the barrio and became the pioneers and witnessed the pristine beauty of the place and later in cultivated and tilled its virgin and fertile land.

It produces bottled Sinturis Juice, pasteurized freshly squeezed Philippine orange mixed with sugar, Malagkit Festival with the different kakanin made from malagkit. It also has several resorts and leisure farms that serve as favorite getaways for fun and family get together.

It is composed of 20 barangays, each headed by a barangay captain and seven councilmen duly elected.

History
Buliran, a barangay of the present-day municipality of San Antonio, is a progressive one at its western part. Its history is still unknown to many people, which were told by two aged persons by the name of Mrs. Hermogina Quizon and Mr. Venancio Ilagan. According to them this barrio was named Bulihan. When they inhabited the place, they found the place a big area and crowded with tall cogon, talahib and amorsiko grasses, wild vines and giant-like trees along the river. The first people to inhabit the place were from the western part of the place or Batangueño who witnessed the wild animals loitering around. They were also the inhabitants who cultivated the land in spite of the fear they feel when this barrio was inhabited by the outlaws headed by Kolas Igat.

This place which was the hideout of the out - laws was named to belong to "Impierno," which literally translates to hell, based on the killings of the prisoners of Kolas lgat. Kolas Igat and his men frequented the municipalities of San Pablo, Tiaong, Candelaria, San Juan, Padre Garcia and those who did not obey his orders were made prisoners and sentenced to death at "Impierno". Because of the many lives seized by the outlaw leader, the place was called "Buliran".

Then under the administration of Kapitan Pedro Veneracion during the Spanish Regime, he distributed the land to the people. To allure the Batangueños, a road leading to Padre Garcia and Tiaong was opened. Every person who received a piece of land was asked to pay a tax of one peso or to donate free labor for one week in the construction of the road. As expected, the population grew fast and the people established residence along the road. Simeon de Torres, a barrio ruler, was among the inhabitants who have done a lot towards the attainment of peace and prosperity of the place.

Time passed until 1938 when the barrio market was established through the kindness of Mr. Valentin Umali who lent the market site. A bridge was constructed between Niing and Buliran. A school building was constructed also, so with the first Catholic Chapel. In the year 1946, General Andres "Dumas" Umali thought of making Buliran a municipality separate from Tiaong. There were many hindrances as a result of the World War II. Time goes by and the barrio progressed. The barrio lieutenants then of Niing, Buliran, Pury, Behia, Callejon and Matipunso held a meeting and resolved to bring the matter to the Municipal Council of Tiaong through the Municipal Councilor, Juanito C. Wagan. The municipal council did not approve, however, the resolution. The insistent municipal councilor, then thought of approaching the congressman of the first district of Quezon, Manuel S. Enverga. He was advised to prepare a petition and brought it to the attention of the provincial board. The parish priest Calixto Jamilla, who was among the petitioner, choose the name San Antonio after St. Anthony of Padua because of the miracles he had shown.

At Lucena, objections were raised. A public hearing was set at the Municipal Hall of Tiaong. The matter was fully deliberated upon, and the reasons for its creation were found satisfactory. The petition then was elevated to the Executive Secretary.

Years passed, President Carlos P. Garcia signed Executive Order Number 270 on October 4, 1957, creating the new municipality of San Antonio. On November 19, 1957, a municipal mayor, vice mayor and six councilmen were appointed who took their oaths of office on November 22, 1957. The first municipal council session was held on November 25, 1957.

Geography

Barangays
San Antonio is politically subdivided into 20 barangays.

Climate

Demographics

Economy

Education

Preschool

Elementary

Secondary
Bixby Knolls Preparatory Academy, Inc.
Callejon National High School
 ICT-ED Institute of Science and Technology Inc
 Manuel S. Enverga University Foundation
San Antonio National High School
Annex San Antonio National High School, San Jose

Tertiary
 ICT-ED Institute of Science and Technology Inc.
 Manuel S. Enverga University Foundation

Tourism

Resorts
Dela Peña Resort
Baybay Ilog Resort (Hotel & Restaurant)
J. Morales Resort & Hotel
Leachar Resort & Leisure Park 
La Esperanza Resort
Migos Resort
Melicia Beach
Soul Change Cottage Philippines Inc (jingi)

Government

Notable personalities

 Gary Jason B. Ejercito Estrada, actor, former Quezon 2nd district Board Member, and nephew of former President Joseph Ejercito Estrada
 Kiko Ejercito Estrada, actor and son of Gary Ejercito and Cheska Diaz
 Proceso Alcala, former representative of Quezon 2nd District and former Agriculture Secretary

References

External links

San Antonio Profile at PhilAtlas.com
[ Philippine Standard Geographic Code]
Philippine Census Information
Local Governance Performance Management System
San Antonio, Quezon

Municipalities of Quezon
Establishments by Philippine executive order